The Mayo Clinic Hospital – Rochester is a 2,059-bed teaching hospital located in Rochester, Minnesota. It comprises the Saint Marys Campus with its Mayo Eugenio Litta Children's Hospital, as well as its Methodist Campus, forming an integral part of the Mayo Clinic academic medical center. Mayo Clinic Hospital – Rochester is ranked first on the 2019–20 U.S. News & World Report Best Hospitals Honor Roll.

History
Saint Marys Hospital was founded in 1889 by a local Franciscan religious community, the Sisters of Saint Francis of Rochester, Minnesota, led by Mother Alfred Moes. Five buildings at the Saint Marys Campus are named to honor Saint Marys' foundress and first administrator, Mother Alfred, and four Sisters who previously served as hospital administrators: Sisters Joseph, Domitilla, Mary Brigh and Generose. The Francis Building honors the many Franciscan Sisters who have served since the founding of Saint Marys.

Originally, the name was spelled "Saint Mary's Hospital", as can be seen in stone above the old front entrance, but in recent years the apostrophe is usually omitted.

In January 2014, Saint Marys and Rochester Methodist were consolidated under the name Mayo Clinic Hospital – Rochester.

Saint Marys Campus

The Mayo Clinic Hospital – Rochester, Saint Marys Campus has 1,265 licensed beds and 64 operating rooms. In 2008, there were 63,000 admissions as well as 28,000 surgical cases that took place in the hospital. The Mayo Clinic Psychiatry and Psychology Treatment Center in the Generose Building is also part of the campus. St. Marys Hospital campus includes the nation's largest intensive care unit, which includes about 200 ICU beds and 200 "step-down" ICU beds.

The hospital is accredited as a Level I trauma center and stroke center. It is the seat of the Southern Minnesota Regional Trauma Advisory Committee, serving a population of almost 900,000.

Saint Marys has a more than 76-bed emergency department but no obstetrics department, while Rochester Methodist lacks an emergency department but contains an obstetrics department. Saint Marys Hospital Emergency Department provides care for approximately 80,000 patients per year, serving the local population (constituting about 85% of patients) and being a referral for southern and central Minnesota, northern Iowa and western Wisconsin through Mayo One medical helicopter service. The Emergency Department includes a state of the art electronic all comprehensive patient flow system (known as "Yes"), 6 large trauma bays, universal (ICU capable) rooms, dedicated pediatric area, high acuity beds, 9 bed observation unit, fast-track/intake, slit lamp room, 4 psychiatry-specific beds, acclimatized ambulance entrance and garage. St Marys also has a multiple dedicated trauma/surgical ICU's and hybrid operating rooms to provide the highest level of trauma care for the surrounding community.

Mayo Eugenio Litta Children's Hospital 
The Saint Marys Campus houses the 148-bed Mayo Eugenio Litta Children's Hospital, offering multidisciplinary pediatric and adolescent care to infants, children, teens, and young adults aged 0–21. Mayo Clinic Children's Center includes providers from over 40 medical and surgical specialties. The new hospital was opened in 1996 at a cost of $13 million. The hospital was named after Eugenio Litta, a 14-year-old boy who died from a ruptured appendix. The hospital ranks nationally in 6 different pediatric specialties.

Methodist Campus
The Mayo Clinic Hospital – Rochester, Methodist Campus has 794 licensed beds and 51 operating rooms. The campus includes the Richard O. Jacobson Building, home to the proton beam therapy program.

Rankings 
In 2016–17, Mayo Clinic, Rochester, was ranked as the #1 overall hospital in the United States by U.S. News & World Report. A total of almost 5,000 hospitals were considered and ranked in 16 specialties from cancer and heart disease to respiratory disorders and urology; 153 (just over 3 percent of the total) were ranked in at least one of the 16 specialties. Of the 153 hospitals that are ranked in one or more specialties, 20 qualified for the Honor Roll by earning high scores in at least six specialties. Mayo Clinic, Rochester, was ranked in the top 10 in all but one of 16 specialties, in the top 4 in 13 specialties, and was the #1 ranked hospital in 8 of the 12 data-driven specialties.  This year U.S. News expanded their common procedures and conditions list to 9 individual measures, and Mayo was one of fewer than 70 hospitals to score High Performing in every category.  Additionally, Mayo was the only hospital on the 2016–2017 honor roll to also receive 5 stars from CMS.  Every Mayo Clinic hospital received an "A" safety rating from Leapfrog in its April 2017 report. In 2019–20, Mayo Clinic, Rochester, was ranked again as the #1 overall hospital in the United States by U.S. News & World Report.

Ranked 1st
 Diabetes and Endocrinology
 Gastroenterology
 Geriatrics
 Gynecology
 Nephrology
 Neurology and Neurosurgery
 Pulmonology
 Urology

Ranked 2nd
 Cardiology and Heart Surgery
 Ear, Nose and Throat
 Orthopedics

Ranked 3rd – 6th
 Cancer (3rd)
 Rheumatology (4th)
 Rehabilitation (6th) 
 Psychiatry (6th)

High-Performing
 Ophthalmology

See also 
Mayo Clinic Arizona
Mayo Clinic Florida
Mayo Clinic College of Medicine and Science
Mayo Clinic Cancer Center

References

Hospitals established in 1889
Franciscan hospitals
Hospitals in Minnesota
Mayo Clinic buildings
Skyscrapers in Rochester, Minnesota
Catholic hospitals in North America